The Building Societies Act 1986 is an Act of Parliament of the United Kingdom governing building societies (mutually-owned mortgage-lending institutions). It removed certain restrictions on the range of services they could offer, so that they could compete with banks on a level basis: they could now make unsecured loans, offer cheque accounts, exchange currencies, provide stockbroking services, manage personal equity plans (tax-privileged investment accounts) and portfolios of unit trusts, arrange and advise on insurance, etc. A new regulatory agency, the Building Societies Commission, was set up to supervise the activities of the societies, which were allowed to de-mutualise and become public limited companies subject to the agreement of their depositors.

This Act and the Big Bang stockmarket reform, also in the UK, also in 1986, were the two central planks of the move to financial deregulation in the United Kingdom in the 1980s. The Financial Services Act 1986 was also part of that movement.

See also
Building Societies Act

References 

United Kingdom Acts of Parliament 1986
Banking in the United Kingdom
1986 in economics
Building societies of the United Kingdom